"America" is a song written and originally recorded by Neil Diamond, released in 1980 on the soundtrack album of Diamond's film The Jazz Singer. The song was a hit single in the United States in 1981, reaching number eight on the Billboard Hot 100, and was Diamond's sixth number one on the Adult Contemporary chart. Billboard also rated it the #62 pop single overall for 1981. Although the single version was a studio recording, overdubs of crowd cheering simulate the feel of a live performance.

, the song had sold 634,440 downloads in the United States since Nielsen started tracking sales.

Background
The song's theme is a positive interpretation of the history of immigration to the United States, during both the early 1900s and the present. Combining Diamond's typically powerful melody, dynamic arrangement, and bombastic vocal, it ends with an interpolation of the traditional patriotic song "My Country, 'Tis of Thee". In Diamond's concerts, the song is a very popular number both at home and abroad, with a large United States flag often displayed from the rafters on cue to the lyric "Every time that flag's unfurled / They're coming to America." The song was featured at the Stone Mountain Laser Show near Atlanta, Georgia.

Record World said that "Rumbling drums and Diamond's dramatic, upbeat vocal will incite waves of patriotic surges."

The song has been used in a number of contexts, including as a theme song for Michael Dukakis' 1988 presidential campaign and in promotion of the 1996 Olympics. Diamond also sang it at the centennial re-dedication of the Statue of Liberty and at the Pepsi Center in Denver on 31 December 1999.

Shortly after the September 11, 2001, attacks, Diamond modified the lyrics to "America" slightly during live performances. Instead of "They're comin' to America," toward the end it became "Stand up for America." It was included on a memorandum listing songs deemed inappropriate by Clear Channel Communications following the September 11 attacks.

Chart history

Weekly charts

Year-end charts

Cover versions
New-age pianist David Lanz performed a cover of this song for his album Finding Paradise.

Me First and the Gimme Gimmes covered this song in their 2008 album Have Another Ball.

Nell Carter covered this song on the show Gimme A Break in 1986 on the episode "Second Chance".

See also
List of number-one adult contemporary singles of 1981 (U.S.)

References

External links
Lyrics in Songfacts

1981 singles
Neil Diamond songs
American patriotic songs
Songs about the United States
Songs written by Neil Diamond
Song recordings produced by Bob Gaudio
1980 songs
Capitol Records singles
Works about immigration to the United States
Songs written for films